Route 495 is a  long north–south secondary highway in the northwest portion of New Brunswick, Canada.

The route's northern terminus is at the intersection of Route 134 and Route 505. It begins as Centennial Avenue West and travels south-west in the community of Rexton. The road runs parallel to the south bank of the Richibucto River as it travels south-west crossing Childs Creek.  The road turns south and comes to the western terminus of Route 470 near Mundleville.  The road then follows the St. Nicholas River as it crosses the East Branch River.  The road continues to follow the South Branch River into the communities of South Branch, Balla Philip and Murphy Settlement before making a sharp 90 degree turn east.  The road continues southeast passing the communities of Bastarache and Saint-Fabien before ending at Route 515 near Saint-Marie-de-Kent.

History

See also

References

495
495